Sycamore Creek is a stream, tributary to the Kings River, in Fresno County, California.

It has its source on the south face of Pine Ridge, in the Sierra National Forest at an elevation of 5540 feet, about 2 miles SW of Sierra Cedars, California, near Shaver Lake.  It descends steeply to its confluence with its north fork at just below 2000 feet elevation and continues southward to its mouth on Pine Flat Lake on the Kings River at 968 feet.

Prior to the construction of the Pine Flat Dam and the creation of Pine Flat Lake, Sycamore Creek flowed directly into the Kings River above the original site of the town of Trimmer, California.

History
The flats at the mouth of Sycamore Creek along the Kings River was the site of the 1850 settler cabin and farm of William Mayfield an early pioneer settler of the San Joaquin Valley and father of Thomas Jefferson Mayfield who grew up there and across the river in the village of the friendly Choinumni, Yokuts people after his stepmother died.  The site of the cabin and village are now under Pine Flats Lake.

References

Rivers of Fresno County, California
Rivers of Northern California